Jahan Khan (Sindhi: جهان خان) is a union council and a town in Taluka (sub-division) Lakhi Ghulam Shah, district Shikarpur in the province of Sindh. It is directly connected with a grand avenue Sukkur-Jacobabad Highway. The town is 12 km far from sukkur to the north-western side on the way to Shikarpur. The population is 4000 according to the national census 2017.

Education 
Education opportunities are given to the local Students as well as for remote villages with 2 boys schools and one girls' school.

References

Populated places in Shikarpur District
Towns in Pakistan